Chris Baillie may refer to:
 Chris Baillie (politician) (born 1961 or 1962)
 Chris Baillie (hurdler) (born 1981)